Hilaria Baldwin (born Hillary Lynn Hayward-Thomas, January 6, 1984) is an American yoga instructor, entrepreneur, podcaster, and author. She was the co-founder of a chain of New York-based yoga studios called Yoga Vida, and has released an exercise DVD and a wellness-focused book. She has been married to actor Alec Baldwin since 2012.

From December 2020 onwards, she has faced allegations of cultural appropriation.

Early life
Baldwin was born Hillary Lynn Hayward-Thomas in Boston, Massachusetts on January 6, 1984 to Kathryn Hayward and David Thomas Jr. Her mother grew up in Massachusetts and spent her career practicing medicine there; she was an associate physician at Massachusetts General Hospital and assistant professor of medicine at Harvard Medical School before retiring from both positions in 2012. Her father was an attorney with an undergraduate degree in Spanish literature from Haverford College and a law degree from Georgetown University. The couple founded International Integrators, an integrative health organization, after moving to Spain and settling in Mallorca in 2011, not long before their daughter married Alec Baldwin. She has a brother named Jeremy Hayward-Thomas. Baldwin claims that she was raised in a Spanish-speaking household and traveled to Spain annually. Baldwin stated she has been vegetarian since age five.

Baldwin is of English, French-Canadian, German, Irish, and Slovak descent. Her paternal grandfather was David L. Thomas Sr. (1927/1928–2020), an "American with roots in the country that pre-dated the American Revolution", and her paternal grandmother, Mary Lou (Artman) Thomas, was from Nebraska. Thomas Sr. was a native of Ames, Iowa and traveled extensively to Argentina as an auditor for General Electric and at one point lived there. He exposed his children to world cultures and raised them to be proficient in Spanish. 

She attended the Cambridge School of Weston, a private co-educational high school in Weston, Massachusetts. She later started college at age 19 at New York University, where she was on the ballroom dance team.

Career
Baldwin started practicing yoga around age 20. While attending New York University, Baldwin opened the yoga studio Yoga Vida in 2009 along with Michael "Mike" Patton in the West Village of New York City, which eventually opened three other locations in the Noho, DUMBO, and Tribeca neighborhoods. The Tribeca Citizen wrote in 2016 that their location had a range of classes, including "pre- and post-natal, restorative, and heated by infrared light". In 2013, Spencer Wolff, a former student in one of her classes, sued Baldwin in Manhattan Supreme Court for an injury he allegedly sustained in the class. The lawsuit was settled a year later, with Wolff signing a non-disclosure agreement.

In 2012, after marrying Alec, Baldwin became a lifestyle correspondent for the entertainment show Extra. The New York Times wrote that Baldwin got the position because Alec was a friend of Steve Sunshine, a producer for the show. In 2014, she shared a Daytime Emmy Award for Outstanding Entertainment News Program with her Extra colleagues. She periodically worked with Extra in that role through 2014.

In October 2013, Baldwin released an exercise DVD titled @ Home with Hilaria Baldwin: Fit Mommy-to-Be Prenatal Yoga. Alec appears during a five-minute "bonus section". In June 2014, El País described Baldwin as the "Gwyneth Paltrow" of New York City in reference to being a working wealthy mother.

Baldwin wrote the book The Living Clearly Method, which was released December 2016. When the book released, Baldwin started an associated website under the same name to promote it. 

In 2017, Baldwin was awarded the Wellness Foundation's Illumination Award at that organization's summer benefit in the Hamptons.

In 2018, Baldwin partnered with podcaster Daphne Oz to create Mom Brain, a motherhood-focused podcast. Refinery29 described it as "a deep-dive into every single corner of motherhood, ranging from the serious moments to the hilarious ones, and everything in between". The two hosts went on The Rachael Ray Show in November 2018 to talk about the project, followed by the Today show in December of that year. As of May 2021, Baldwin had not recorded any more episodes since the start of the allegations of cultural appropriation in December 2020. 

In February 2019, Baldwin and her husband spoke to a United Nations panel about food choices and a sustainable planet at the launch of the EAT-Lancet Commission on Food, Health and Planet initiative. Baldwin was identified as a "wellness expert" on the panel.

Baldwin has been on the cover of multiple magazines, the most notable of which include Hello!, Fit Pregnancy, ¡Hola!, Parents; and Belgium's Télépro.

Personal life
In February 2011, she met Alec Baldwin at Sarma Melngailis' New York restaurant Pure Food and Wine. Around August that year, the two began dating. They moved from the Upper West Side to Greenwich Village that August. The couple became engaged in April 2012 and married on June 30, 2012, in a Catholic ceremony at St. Patrick's Old Cathedral in New York City. On their wedding bands, they had Somos un buen equipo engraved in Spanish inscribed on the inside. The couple have seven children together: Carmen Gabriela (born August 23, 2013), Rafael Thomas (born June 17, 2015), Leonardo Angel Charles (born September 12, 2016), Romeo Alejandro David (born May 17, 2018), Eduardo Pau Lucas (born September 8, 2020), María Lucía Victoria (born February 25, 2021 via surrogate), and Ilaria Catalina Irena (born September 22, 2022).
She is also stepmother to Ireland Baldwin, Alec's daughter from his previous marriage to American actress Kim Basinger.

Baldwin struggled with anorexia nervosa and bulimia in her high school years and early twenties. In her book Baldwin recounted she suffered health issues and was miserable; feeling that way motivated her future career as a healthy lifestyle advocate. Baldwin stated she started getting better when she started "thinking of weight and health separately".

After her husband accidentally fatally shot cinematographer Halyna Hutchins with a prop gun in October 2021, Baldwin posted on her Instagram, "My heart is with Halyna. Her husband. Her son. Their family and loved ones. And my Alec."

Allegations of cultural appropriation
In December 2020, a Twitter user accused Baldwin of "impersonat[ing] a Spanish person" and posted a number of video clips of Baldwin speaking with a contrived Spanish accent, including a clip from the Today Show in which Baldwin seemingly forgot the English word for "cucumber". The tweets prompted a number of news articles and accusations of cultural appropriation, since at other times she was heard speaking American accented English. Her agency's website listed her birthplace as Mallorca rather than Boston, and commentators noted that Baldwin is often misidentified as either Mallorcan, Spanish, or Latina, encouraging positive press by Hispanic media such as the Spanish-language celebrity gossip magazine ¡Hola!

BuzzFeed writer Natasha Jokic wrote, "Looking through Hilaria's tweets, it does seem like she's gone to great lengths to never explicitly say that she's Spanish – but she has gotten pretty close." An article from The Things mentioned that Baldwin's cousin stated that her visits to Spain were for vacations only and that she is "zero percent Spanish". Former classmates have alleged she had "much paler skin and blonde hair" before she changed her name from Hillary to Hilaria. Some Twitter users and members of the press compared Baldwin to Rachel Dolezal, an American woman who identifies as "black" despite being white and having white parents. In March 2021, The Atlantic listed Baldwin as an "identity hoaxer" along with Dolezal and Jessica Krug. 

Baldwin responded that she identifies as white, and her ethnic background includes "many, many, many things". She said she spent "some" of her childhood in Spain and "some" in Massachusetts, but had never been enrolled in school in Spain, only spending time there during family holidays. Baldwin also asserted in a New York Times interview that her inability to remember the word "cucumber" on Today came from stage fright during one of her first television appearances, and that she is bilingual and her accent comes and goes depending on stress and other factors. In July 2021 Baldwin described herself as "multi" and culturally "fluid".

A Reddit area of interest, or subreddit, is dedicated to the cultural appropriation scandal and conspiracy theories surrounding Baldwin. As of March 2023, the r/HilariaBaldwin subreddit had gained 46,000 followers. Baldwin has never addressed the subreddit or the conspiracy theories directly.

References

External links
 

Living people
1984 births
2020 controversies in the United States
21st-century American businesswomen
21st-century American businesspeople
American people of English descent
American people of French-Canadian descent
American people of German descent
American people of Irish descent
American people of Slovak descent
American women company founders
American company founders
American women podcasters
American podcasters
American yoga teachers
Hilaria
People from Boston
People from Weston, Massachusetts
New York University alumni